The Mayor of Antananarivo is the Mayor of the capital and largest city in Madagascar, Antananarivo.

The post of mayor of Antananarivo is considered to be one of the most prominent and influential offices in Madagascar. It is also considered one of the "politically defining posts" in the country, from which politicians often emerge into higher offices, such as the Malagasy Presidency.

The former President of Madagascar, Marc Ravalomanana, was mayor of the city when he rose to power in 2002. Andry Rajoelina was elected as Mayor in December 2007 and became Ravalomanana's main opponent, leading a general strike in Antananarivo in January 2009.

On 3 February 2009, after declaring himself to be in charge of the country, Rajoelina was dismissed as Mayor and a special delegation, headed by Guy Randrianarisoa, was appointed instead. Rajoelina denounced the decision, saying that there was "no valid reason" for it and that he was prepared to face arrest if necessary; he warned that the city would "not accept this decision". At a rally on 4 February, Rajoelina described the appointment of Randrianarisoa as "an insult to the people of Madagascar"; he instead designated Michèle Ratsivalaka to succeed him as Mayor and gave her his mayoral scarf. Rajoelina took power as head of state in March 2009. He later replaced Ratsivalaka with Edgard Razafindravahy, who served without vice-presidents throughout his term. He resigned in August 2013 to enter in the 2013 presidential election and the city of Antananarivo remained without leadership until November 2013, when Olga Rasamimanana was named to one of the vice-presidency positions, making her de facto mayor of Antananarivo.

List of mayors

Appointed mayors
From 1897 to 1956, mayors were appointed by the Governor-General of Madagascar.

(Only last names are listed)
 1897: Deslions
 1899: Rambeau
 1903: Berthier
 1904: 
 1907: Titeux
 1909: De Mortière
 1910: Bord
 1911: Hesling
 1912: Bensch
 1913: De Guise
 1914: Carron
 1917: Berthier
 1919: De Chazal
 1920: Voyron
 1922: Pechmarty
 1927: Pont
 1927: Giresse
 1929: Krotoff
 1929: De Longchamp
 1930: Battini
 1932: Rambeau
 1932: Henry
 1933: Rambeau
 1935: Henri
 1937: Pechayrand
 1937: Bourgoin
 1938: Leuerre
 1938: Rambeau
 1940: Poupon
 1941: Bruniquel
 1942: Riddell
 1943: Prospérial
 1945: Prospérini
 1945: Hue
 1946: Rambeau
 1947: Bordier
 1949: Vignau
 1950: Fayoul
 1951: Vignau
 1954: Le Garreres
 1955: Saget

Source: Histoire de la commune

Elected mayors

Source:

See also
 Timeline of Antananarivo

References

Mayors of Antananarivo